This is the complete list of Asian Games medalists in beach volleyball from 1998 to 2018.

Men

Women

References 

Medalists Men
Medalists Women

External links 
 Asian Volleyball Confederation

Beach volleyball
medalists